Fagus is an unincorporated community in southeastern Butler County, Missouri, United States. It is located on Route 51, approximately 18 miles southeast of Poplar Bluff and one mile north of the Arkansas state line.

A post office called Fagus was established in 1913, and remained in operation until 1973. The community was founded by lumberman William N. Barron and named after the Latin word for "beech tree".

References

Unincorporated communities in Butler County, Missouri
Unincorporated communities in Missouri